Britains' Deetail toy soldiers were a popular product in the 1970s and 1980s. Manufactured in England by W. Britain, the 1/32 (54mm) scale plastic figures were finished with hand painted details and came with sturdy Zamak metal bases. In the early 1990s production moved to China before eventually being phased out.

Development
In 1971, Britains began phasing out its plastic Herald Miniatures produced in Hong Kong since 1966, with Herald eventually ceasing production in 1976. New Deetail figures were produced moulded in PVC plastic rather than polythene and using plug-in type arms, which were glued to bodies resulting in poses previously unavailable.  Figures were moulded with a tee shaped "footlug" on the feet of each figure that allowed secure attachment to sturdy metal bases. These rectangular metal bases ensured figures stood better than rival manufacturers products and paid homage to Britains hollowcast metal figures as well as being thought by consumers to be of "better value" due to their heavier weight.

The first Deetail figures produces were based upon Second World War (WW2) American and German infantry. Sculptor Rod Cameron rented uniforms from Berman's and Nathan's theatrical costumes with Cameron giving model Les Harden his air rifle to pose with.

In 1978 Britains developed the Super Deetail range using an overmoulding process whereby different coloured plastics came together in one figure.  The initial release were modern British paratroopers with red berets.

Range

Figures were generally produced in six different standing poses and represented various historical periods from medieval  to the modern era including:

Knights and Turks
Waterloo 
American Wild West - Cowboys and Indians, 7th Cavalry, etc.
American Civil War 
African Desert 
Military - WW2 British, American, German; Modern; Guards, etc.
Space

Mounted figures were also released including a horse on metal base with rider glued in place. Riders and horses were presented in various different poses and came with reins, saddle and saddle blanket, which differed dependent upon the theme. All were commercially available from retail outlets and sold either lose or from retail/trade "counter" boxes containing 48 pcs for standing (usually eight of each pose); 18 pcs for mounted figures (six of each pose); or 12 for combat weapons sets - these retail boxes also came with handy plinths to display the models, which sat across the top of the each box as a promotional item. Many factory sealed boxed/play sets (ranging from 5-18 figures) were issued to retailers, along with smaller "blister" type packs containing several figures bundled together, and a "Patrol" range that included figures and a combat weapon.

In addition, Britains also produced sets which incorporated Deetail style figures that were marketed as Combat Weapons (mortar, recoilless rifle, gatling gun, etc.), Military Vehicles (scout cars, jeeps, etc.) and Motorcycles (dispatch rider, motorcycle combination). Combat Weapons sets used working, spring loaded firing mechanisms within the models, and were supplied with "ammunition" - 9 ball bearings for the Vickers and Gatling gun sets, and 12 plastic shells on a sprue for mortars and recoilless rifle.

Knights and Turks

Knights
7740 Series One (Foot)

 King with Sword.
 Knight sword low and back and shield.
 Knight sword overhead and shield.
 Knight sword high back and shield.
 Knight with halberd in both hands.
 Knight axe overhead held in both hands.

7730 Series Two (Foot)

Turks

7750

Issued Sets
TBC

Waterloo (1815)

Like Airfix, Britains used the label Waterloo rather than Napoleonic. Figures depicting British and French armies were produced from 1974-79 in foot and mounted types.

British
Infantry - 3 x Foot (advancing with rifle; kneeling shooting; officer holding sword & flag); and 3 x Highland Black Watch (kneeling with rifle; standing shooting rifle; advancing with rifle)
Cavalry - 2 x Hussars, 2 x Scots Greys, 2 x Life Guards

French
Infantry - 3 x Line Infantry (advancing with rifle; standing shooting rifle; officer holding sword & flag) and 3 Imperial Guard (kneeling with rifle; standing shooting rifle; advancing with rifle)
Cavalry - 2 x Hussars 2 x Cuirassier 2 x Carabinier

Issued Sets

7940 British Infantry retail counter box (48 pcs)
7950 French Infantry retail counter box (48 pcs)
7949 British Cavalry retail counter box (18 pcs)
7959 French Cavalry retail counter box (18 pcs)
7944 British Infantry 6 pcs
7945 British 6 pcs (2 mounted)

7946 British & French 5 pcs
7947 British 12 pcs (3 mounted)
7954 French Infantry 6 pcs
7955 French 6 pcs (2 mounted)
7956 British & French 5 pcs
7957 French 12 pcs (3 mounted)
7960 British & French 12 pcs (2 mounted)

African Desert (1900s) 

Figures depicting French Foreign Legion (FFL) legionnaires and Arab tribesmen were produced in foot and mounted types from 1975-78.

French Foreign Legion

6 Legionnaires including an officer
6 cavalry including an officer
Combat Weapons - Gatling gun set with 2 figures (officer and gunner) and ammunition.

Arab Tribesmen
6 foot 
6 mounted

Issued Sets

7780 FFL retail counter box (48 pcs)
7790 Arab retail counter box (48 pcs)
7779 FFL retail counter box (18 pcs mounted)
77-- Arab retail counter box (18 pcs mounted)
7770 FFL Gatling Gun retail counter box (12 pcs)

7785 FFL (6 pcs)
7785 FFL (6 pcs, 2 mounted)
7775 FFL & Arabs (6 pcs, 2 mounted)
7783 FFL Patrol (4 pcs, 1 Gatling Gun)
7787 FFL (12 pcs, 3 mounted)
7795 Arabs (6 pcs, 2 mounted)
7797 Arabs (12 pcs 3 mounted)
7799 FFL & Arab (12 pcs, 2 mounted)

American Wild West (1870s)

Figures depicting US 7th Cavalry, cowboys, Apache, Sioux and Mexicans were produced in foot and mounted types.

US 7th Cavalry

6 troopers including General Custer. General Custer is the only model in the Britains Deetail range that represents a real historical person. 
6 cavalry

Cowboys

6 foot
6 mounted

Sioux
7 foot warriors
6 mounted warriors
One standing figure was discontinued and a brand new pose was created because it was easier to manufacture. The older pose came with a separate spear and the new one has no additional parts but holds an axe and a pistol.

Apache

6 foot warriors
6 mounted warriors

Mexicans

6 foot
6 mounted

Issued Sets
TBC

American Civil War

Figures depicting Federal (Union) and Confederate (Rebel) forces were produced from 1972-80 in foot and mounted types.

Federal
6 Infantry standing shooting rifle; kneeling shooting rifle; advancing with rifle; standing loading rifle; officer with sword and pistol; NCO with flag and pistol 
6 Cavalry
Combat Weapons - Gatling gun set with 2 figures (officer and gunner) and ammunition

Confederate
6 Infantry - standing shooting rifle; kneeling shooting rifle; advancing with rifle; standing loading rifle; officer with sword and pistol; NCO with flag and pistol
6 Cavalry
Combat Weapons -Gatling gun set with 2 figures (officer and gunner) and ammunition

Figures for both types were exactly the same just molded and painted in different colours. Initial releases had longer rifles and plug-in arms, which were eventually discontinued and replaced with fully moulded figures.

Issued Sets

7440 Confederate retail counter box (48 pcs)
7450 Federal retail counter box (48 pcs)
7449 Union retail counter box (18 pcs mounted)
7439 Confederate retail counter box (18 pcs mounted)
7470 Union Gatling Gun retail counter box (12 pcs)
7460 Confederate Gatling Gun retail counter box (12 pcs)
7422 Confederate (5 pcs, 2 mounted)
7423 Confederate Patrol (4 pcs, 1 Gatling Gun)
7424 Confederate (6 pcs, 2 mounted)
7425 Confederate (6 pcs, 2 mounted)
7426 Confederate (7 pcs)

7426 Confederate (12 pcs 3 mounted)
7427 Confederate (6 pcs)
7428 Confederate (5 pcs, 2 mounted)
7452 Federal (5 pcs, 2 mounted)
7453 Federal Patrol (4 pcs, 1 Gatling Gun)
7454 Federal (6 pcs, 2 mounted)
7455 Federal (6 pcs, 2 mounted)
7456 Federal (7 pcs)
7456 Federal (12 pcs, 3 mounted)
7457 Federal (6 pcs)
7458 Federal (5 pcs, 2 mounted)
7462 Federal & Confederate (19 pcs, 6 mounted, 1 gatling gun)
7463 Federal & Confederate (12 pcs 3 mounted)
7466 Federal & Confederate Battle Set (9 pcs, 1 gatling gun)

Military

Figures depicting WWII American, German, British and Japanese forces were produced from 1971–89, with initial production of American and German figures only on brown/tan metal bases - eventually discontinued and replaced from 1974 with the standard green type. Figures were issued in the standard series of six pose types, except American and German figures which came in two separate series of six poses (12 in total) and included helmet decals in the form of red shield with black star (American) and shields with Imperial colours of red, white and black (German). Japanese, British 8th Army and German Afrika Korps were produced in limited quantities until production ceased in 1976 and 1979 respectively. Combat weapons sets and associated military vehicles also complimented the series.

American US WW2
6 Infantry (1st series)
6 Infantry (2nd series)
Combat Weapons
US recoilless rifle (75mm gun) set with 2 man crew (officer and gunner) and 12 plastic "shells" attached to a sprue
105mm pack howitzer with shells
Military vehicles
Willys Jeep with 2 man crew (driver and gunner with M83)
Helicopter with 2 man crew and casualty on stretcher, rotating blades and working winch
Motorcycles
Motorcycle with dispatch rider
Issued Sets

7340 Retail counter box Infantry (48 pcs)
7334 Retail counter box Recoilless Rifle (12 pcs)
7343 Patrol (4 pcs, 1 gun)
7344 Infantry (6 pcs)
7347 Infantry (18 pcs)
7347 Infantry (7pcs)

9761 Hughes 300C Helicopter
9682 US Despatch Rider
9786 US Jeep

German Army WWII
Infantry
1st series (6 figures) - kneeling with MG42, charging with fixed bayonet, standing throwing grenade, standing firing rifle, advancing firing MP41, carrying a Panzerbüchse anti-tank gun and ammo box
2nd series (6 figures, manufactured 1977-1989) - officer, radio operator, kneeling firing rifle, marching with rifle at slope, flamethrower, carrying Panzerbüchse anti-tank gun across body
Combat Weapons
Mortar set with 2 man crew (1 loading, 1 firing) with 12 plastic "shells" attached to a sprue
Pak field gun with shells
Military Vehicles
Kettenkrad half track with 2 man crew (driver and passenger)
Kubelwagen scout car with 2 man crew (driver and gunner firing MG40)
Motorcycles
Motorcycle with dispatch rider
Motorcycle combination (motorbike and sidecar) with 2 man crew (rider and gunner firing MG40)
Both sets include a shouldered rifle which is attached to the riders back

Issued Sets

7380 Infantry retail counter box (48 pcs)
7333 Mortar retail counter box Mortar (12 pcs)
7343/2 Patrol (4 pcs, 1 mortar)
7348 British & German Battle Set (18 pcs)
7354 Infantry (6 pcs)
7356 Infantry (7 pcs)
7357 Infantry (18 pcs)
7386 Infantry (7pcs)
7385 Infantry (6 pcs)

9732 German Field Gun
9751 Army Group series - British & German (12 pcs)
9679 German Army Dispatch Rider
9681 German Army Combination
9788 Army Group series - German Scout Car and Gun (2 pcs)
9783 Kubelwagen (Scout Car)
9780 Kettenkrad Halftrack

Afrika Korps WW2

6 Infantry (manufactured 1973-76)
Military Vehicles
Kubelwagen Scout Car with 2 man crew (driver and officer)
Motorcycles
Motorcycle (BMW) with dispatch rider
Motorcycle combination (sidecar) with 2 man crew (rider and gunner firing MG40)

Issued Sets

7370 Retail counter box (48 pcs)
7375 (6 pcs)

British Army WW2
Infantry (manufactured 1973-89)
Initially produced with a stained/faded paint finish, 
TBC
Combat Weapons
Mortar set with 2 man crew (1 loading, 1 firing) with 12 plastic "shells" attached to a sprue
25 pdr gun with shells
BAT (Wombat anti tank gun) with shells
Military Floating Models
Assault craft with 2 man crew
Submarine with 2 man crew (frogmen/divers)
Military Vehicles
Short Wheel Base Military Land Rover with 2 man crew (driver & Bren gunner)
SWB Land Rover with driver and gunner 90 with Winch
Motorcycles
Motorcycle (850cc Norton) with dispatch rider

Issued Sets

7342 Infantry retail counter box (48 pcs)
7338 Mortar retail counter box (12 pcs)
4302 2-Man Submarine
4312 Assault Craft 
7341 Patrol (4 pcs, 1 Mortar)
7345 Infantry (6 pcs)
7346 Infantry (18 pcs)
7347 Infantry (7 pcs)

7348 British & German Battle Set (18 pcs)
9672 British Despatch Rider
9704 25 Pounder Gun
9720 British Anti-Tank Gun
9751 British & German (Army Group set 12 pcs) 
9787 Army Land Rover and Gun (Army Group set 2 pcs)
9781 Scout Car 
9782 Military Land Rover

Desert Rats 8th Army WW2

6 Infantry (manufactured 1973-76)

Combat Weapons
Vickers MG with 2 man crew (1 loading, 1 firing) with ammunition
Military Vehicles
Daimler scout car with 2 man crew

Issued Sets
7339 Vickers Gun retail counter box (12 pcs)
7395 Infantry (6 pcs)
Patrol (4 pcs, 1 gun)
TBC

Imperial Japanese Army
6 Infantry (manufactured 1973-76)
Combat Weapons
75mm recoilless rifle set with 2 man crew (officer and gunner) with 12 plastic "shells" attached to a sprue

Issued Sets
7355 Infantry (6 pcs)
7353 Patrol (4 pcs, 1 gun)
TBC

Accessories
4715 Battleground Playset
4731 Bombed Buildings Set (Army Group set)
9791 Plastic shells (for use with guns 9704/9720/9732)
  Plastic shell sprue (for use with combat weapons (7333/7334/7438)
88 Britains Deetail Point of Sale poster on thick card in colour. Depicts the range of dismounted figures and mounted.

Super Deetail
Super Deetail figures initially featured as a prototype set of six modern British paratroopers at a 1978 London toy fair. The new moulds allowed finer details compared to Deetail range, however four of the six figures never made it into widescale production due to manufacturing difficulties with the new over-moulding process. A set of four were eventually released to the market in 1980 - firing rifle, firing bazooka, throwing grenade and an officer firing pistol. Rather than a particular historical context, they were modelled upon modern style British armed forces - Paratroopers (red berets, green bases), Commandos (green berets, light blue bases) and SAS (grey berets, grey bases).

Issued Sets

6330 SAS Retail Counter Box (48 pcs)
6300 Paratroopers Retail Counter Box (48 pcs)
6320 Marine Commandos Retail Counter Box (48 pcs)

6303 Paratroopers bubble pack (3 pcs)
6314 Paratroopers (6 pcs)
6336 Marine Commandos (6 pcs)

Guards
7250 Scots Guards retail counter box (48 pcs)
7256 Scots Guards (6 pcs)
7223 New Metal Miniatures - Life Guards, Scots Guards, Yeoman (6 pcs)
299 Sentry box

Task Force
The Task Force range was introduced 1995/96 using the US and British WW2 Deetail moulds, but finished with different colour schemes.

Space
The Space range was launched in 1981 and ran until 1985 including Stargard Commandos, Cyborg, Assault Squad, Aliens and Mutants along with various spacecraft and accessories.

Other
Farm
Britains most extensive range including vehicles, figures, buildings and animals.
Police
Motorcycles
Riding
Wildlife
Hospital
Robin Hood
Karate

Now
W. Britains remains the market leader in "toy soldiers" producing high quality hollowcast metal figures as well as a smaller range of hand painted plastic figures, which were reintroduced in 2006 as "Super Detail Plastics" which contain many attributes of the Deetail range first released in the 1970s . In 2016 W. Britains was sold to The Good Soldier LLC, located in Holland, Ohio, USA.

Certain figures using the original Deetail moulds (French Foreign Legion, Afrika Korps, British 8th Army, Arabs, etc.) are now manufactured in Argentina by DSG Plastic Toy Soldiers.

Vintage detail figures with metal bases remain highly popular with collectors and on secondary markets/internet auction sites often sell for - foot/infantry (£1-£5); mounted (£5-£20); full sets of 6 (£15-100); combat weapons (£5-40); and military vehicles (£15-100) all dependent upon condition.

Rarities

Sought after items such as ACW and FFL Gatling gun sets; British 8th Army Vickers gun; Mexican and Apache warriors; WW2 Afrika Korps; Waterloo series and most mounted figures often reach the top end of estimates. Retail counter boxes are particularly rare (£150-£250) and demand is very strong for any items with original packaging (£50-£250), particularly the larger play sets.

Collectors "Holy Grail" include the four Super Deetail paratroopers, which were discontinued due to production issues. It is rumoured only a few thousand made it to retail. First issue American Infantry released with red bases in very limited quantities are also highly prized.

Notes

References
 Pullen, David Britains Toy Model Catalogues 1970 to 1979  Veloce (July 15, 2010), 

Scale modeling
Militaria
1970s toys
1980s toys
Toy figurines
Toy brands
Toy soldier manufacturing companies